Ellen Sprunger (born 5 August 1986, Nyon) is a Swiss track and field athlete.

She competed at the 2012 Summer Olympics in the women's heptathlon event where she finished in 18th place.  She was also part of the Swiss 4 × 100 m team at the event.  Her sister Lea was also part of the Swiss team.

Personal bests
100 metres: 11.52 w. 1.5 (2013)
200 metres: 23.21 0.2 (2016)
800 metres: 2:12.93 (2014)
100 metres hurdles: 13.35 w.2.0 (2012)
High jump: 1.73 (2014)
Long jump: 6.16 w. 0.9 (2013)
Shot put: 13.42 (2014)
Javelin throw: 46.83 (2012)
Heptathlon: 6124 (2012)

References

Living people

Olympic athletes of Switzerland
Athletes (track and field) at the 2012 Summer Olympics
Athletes (track and field) at the 2016 Summer Olympics
1986 births
Swiss female sprinters
Swiss heptathletes
Sportspeople from Lausanne
Olympic female sprinters